June Florence Paul (née Foulds; 13 June 1934 – 6 November 2020) was a  British track and field sprint runner.

Personal life

Born June Florence Foulds in Shepherd's Bush in 1934, she was brought up by her grandparents.  She married British Olympic fencer Raymond Paul. Their son Steven Paul also became an Olympic fencer and their nephew Barry Paul won a Commonwealth Games gold medal. She was the second wife of singer Ronnie Carroll, with whom she co-owned a successful club in Grenada in the 1970s, until political unrest halted tourism. They were to later divorce.  Her third husband was Eric Reynolds, divorcing after two years.  She ran a food stall and became a key figure in the development of the Camden Lock Markets, she ran several restaurants in London, including those trading as "Huffs".  In 1993 she started running the "Hampstead Everyman Cinema", in Hampstead, London, turning the basement into a popular bar and restaurant, later selling the entire site to the Everyman Group.

She appeared as a castaway on the BBC Radio programme Desert Island Discs on 17 November 1958.

Foulds died at the age of 86.

Athletics career
Foulds competed in the 100 m, 200 m and 4 × 100 metres relay at the 1952 and 1956 Olympics and won a bronze and a silver medal in the relay. Her best individual result was fifth place in the 200 m in 1956. At the 1958 British Empire and Commonwealth Games she won a gold medal in the 4×110 yd relay in a world-record time alongside Dorothy Hyman, Madeleine Weston, and Heather Armitage  and placed fourth in the 220 yards and fifth in the 100 yards.

References

1934 births
2020 deaths
British female sprinters
Olympic silver medallists for Great Britain
Olympic bronze medallists for Great Britain
Athletes (track and field) at the 1952 Summer Olympics
Athletes (track and field) at the 1956 Summer Olympics
Olympic athletes of Great Britain
Athletes from London
Commonwealth Games medallists in athletics
European Athletics Championships medalists
Medalists at the 1956 Summer Olympics
Medalists at the 1952 Summer Olympics
Olympic silver medalists in athletics (track and field)
Olympic bronze medalists in athletics (track and field)
Athletes (track and field) at the 1958 British Empire and Commonwealth Games
Commonwealth Games gold medallists for England
Olympic female sprinters
Medallists at the 1958 British Empire and Commonwealth Games